Koroyedovo is a rural locality (a village) in Kurilovskoye Rural Settlement, Sobinsky District, Vladimir Oblast, Russia. The population was 14 as of 2010.

Geography 
Koroyedovo is located on the Vorsha River, 15 km northwest of Sobinka (the district's administrative centre) by road. Vishnyakovo is the nearest rural locality.

References 

Rural localities in Sobinsky District